Néstor Fabián Espínola (born 6 December 1985) was an Argentine footballer. His last team was Club Almagro.

Honours

Club
Patronato de Paraná
 Torneo Argentino A (1): 2009–10

References
 
 

1985 births
Living people
Argentine footballers
Argentine expatriate footballers
Cobresal footballers
Sportivo Patria footballers
Atlético Tucumán footballers
Unión de Sunchales footballers
Club Atlético Patronato footballers
Club de Gimnasia y Esgrima La Plata footballers
Gimnasia y Esgrima de Concepción del Uruguay footballers
Chilean Primera División players
Argentine Primera División players
Expatriate footballers in Chile
Association football midfielders
People from Formosa, Argentina